The Catholic Total Abstinence Union Fountain (1874–77) – also known as The Catholic Total Abstinence Centennial Fountain or The Centennial Fountain – is a now defunct ornamental fountain and drinking fountain located in West Fairmount Park, Philadelphia, Pennsylvania. Created as an attraction for the 1876 Centennial Exposition, it was commissioned by the Catholic Total Abstinence Union of America, a religious organization that advocated for total abstinence from alcohol.

Creation
The fountain was intended to symbolize "the power of religion, the virtues of temperance, and the Irish Catholic love of patriotism and liberty." 

It was designed by German-born-and-trained Philadelphia sculptor Herman Kirn (1847/48 - 1920).  Kirn came to the U.S. at age six, then returned to Karlsruhe as a young adult to study under Carl Johann Steinhäuser for six years.  Steinhäuser provided letters of recommendation for this commission.   Kirn's other work in the park includes the 1883 Willian Penn statue atop Mom Rinker's Rock, titled Toleration, and his Orestes and Pylades drinking fountain of 1884, cast in bronze from a Steinhäuser original design.  During the erection of this last piece, Kirn lost the use of his right arm to a falling piece of stone.  He was thereafter employed by the Park. 

Kirn exhibited a 12-foot diameter plaster of Paris model of the Catholic fountain as early as February 1874, at the city's Academy of Music. Fund-raising for the project was slow, and it wasn't until the following autumn that Kirn formally received the commission. Tyrolean marble was chosen for the statues, and Kirn moved to southern Austria to carve them at a quarry in Laas.

Description

The fountain's 100-foot-wide stepped base is of granite, and in the shape of a Maltese cross. At center is a 40-foot diameter basin featuring a 15-foot statue of Moses, who clutches the Ten Commandments with his left arm, holds his staff (now missing) in his left hand, and points skyward with his shofar or horn (now missing) in his right hand. He stands upon a beehive-shaped mound of marble that signifies the Rock of Horeb, which God instructed Moses to strike with his staff to provide water for the Israelites. The fountain was fed by a reservoir atop nearby George's Hill, and small waterfalls flowed from the rock mound. The basin's marble outer wall features six portrait medallions of prominent Roman Catholics who fought in the Revolutionary War – including George Meade, Count Casimir Pulaski and the Marquis de Lafayette – and the seal of the Total Abstinence Union. Outside the basin, on the arms of the cross, are four larger-than-life subsidiary statues of prominent American Roman Catholics – Archbishop John Carroll, Charles Carroll of Carrollton, Father Theobald Mathew, and Commodore John Barry. Each statue's granite pedestal featured four lion-head spouts from which water flowed, for a total of sixteen drinking fountains.

Dedication
The fountain was dedicated on July 4, 1876; following a mass at the Cathedral of Saints Peter and Paul; and a parade of more than 5,000 north on Broad Street, west on Girard Avenue, and over the Girard Avenue Bridge to the Centennial fairgrounds. Composer Edward Mack wrote the "Centennial Fountain Grand March" for the occasion. Speeches were made by prominent Catholic clergy and individuals, culminating in a final blessing by Father James O'Reilly:Oh God, by whose word all things are made holy, give Thy blessing to this Fountain, and grant that whosoever will make use with thanksgiving, according to Thy will and Thy law, may, through the invocation of Thy most holy name, receive from Thee health of body and spiritual protection, through Christ our Lord, Amen.

The fountain itself was operational for the dedication, including the sixteen pedestal drinking fountains, but only the statue of Commodore Barry was in place. The other four were still in Austria, and in various states of completion. It remained in this condition through the November 1876 closing of the exposition, and beyond. The Father Mathew, Archbishop Carroll, and Charles Carroll of Carrollton statues were dedicated on March 17, 1877 (Saint Patrick's Day); and the central Moses Striking the Rock of Horeb statue was dedicated on July 4, 1877.

Later history
The statue of Father Mathew was damaged by lightning on June 18, 1910. Sculptor Kirn, who had modeled it 35 years earlier, repaired it.

Gallery

See also

 List of public art in Philadelphia
 Drinking fountains in Philadelphia

References

Sources
 Daniel J. Gallagher, The Catholic Centennial Fountain Illustrated: A Tribute of the Catholics of America to the Centennial of the Nation's Birth (Philadelphia: Daniel J. Gallagher, 1877).
 Daria A. Gasparini, A Celebration of Moral Force: The Catholic Total Abstinence Union of America Centennial Fountain, masters thesis, University of Pennsylvania, 2002.

External links
 Aerial Video by Serge Maslennikov from YouTube.
 Catholic Total Abstinence Union Fountain from SIRIS.
 Catholic Total Abstinence Union Fountain from Philadelphia Archdiocese Historical Research Center.
 Catholic Total Abstinence Fountain from Getty Images.

Fountains in Pennsylvania
Outdoor sculptures in Philadelphia
1876 sculptures
Centennial Exposition
West Fairmount Park
Sculptures of Moses
Irish-American culture in Philadelphia
Christian temperance movement
Catholicism in Pennsylvania